The Duke Islamic Studies Center, also known as DISC, is an inter-departmental, cross-cultural center at Duke University dedicated to the study of Islam and Muslims. DISC is the institution in North America for Islamic studies, approaching Islam as a global religion with many distinctive historical and cultural expressions. Duke's tradition of humanistic approaches to the study of Islam and Muslims scholarship is complemented by emerging strength in social science approaches to Islamic Studies.

Established in 2006 as a sequel to the Center for the Study of Muslim Networks, the Duke Islamic Studies Center (DISC) continues to foreground Muslim networks, especially educational networks, as essential instruments for advancing cross-cultural understanding.

Faculty Leadership
Eve M. Duffy, Associate Vice Provost for Global Affairs at Duke, serves as the interim director of Duke Islamic Studies Center. The center was previously led by Ellen McLarney from 2019 - 2022, by Omid Safi, from 2014-2019.

Other prominent faculty leadership include Abdullah Antepli (Chief Representative for Muslim Affairs) and Jen'nan Read (Assistant Director of Special Initiatives).

Other core faculty include: 
 Abdul Sattar J Al Mamouri
 Azeddine Chergui
 miriam cooke
 Christof Galli
 Benjamin Gatling
 Shalom Goldman
 Erdağ Göknar
 Bruce Hall
 Mona Hassan
 Frances Hasso
 Engseng Ho
 Maha Houssami
 Mary Hovespian
 Mohsen Kadivar
 Alex Kirshner
 Claudia Koonz
 Timur Kuran
 Bruce Lawrence
 Mbaye Lo
 Abdeslam Maghraoui
 David Marshall
 Ellen McLarney
 Negar Mottahedeh
 Fattaneh V Naeymi-Rad
 David Schanzer
 Rebecca Stein
 Mustafa Tuna

Projects and Initiatives
In addition to putting on a full slate of programs and events each semester, the Duke Islamic Studies Center sponsors special initiatives that reflect emerging leadership priorities and faculty interests.

Our most recent and most ambitious initiative is the Transcultural Islam Project. This multi-year project was launched in July 2011 with funding support from the Carnegie Corporation. This initiative has two overarching goals: 1) to inform public discourse and policy by publicizing and promoting scholarly and research-based information about Islam and Muslims; 2) to support scholarship and scholarly collaborations to advance research about Islam and Muslims across the globe.

Both of these initiatives were funded by the Social Science Research Council.
 ISLAMiCommentary
 TIRNScholars: Transcultural Islam Research Network
 Duke-RTI Professors & Practitioners Series
 British Council Our Shared Future
 Durham Library- Muslim Bookshelves
 DISC-Oxford Centre for Islamic Studies (OCIS) Partnership
 DISC Media Fellows

DISC Advisory Board
 D. Randall Benn
 Ken Close
 Eugene V. Fife
 Seham Al Foraih
 James P. Gorter
 Nauman Khan
 Bruce B. Lawrence
 Bettye Musham
 Charles Ogburn, Co-chair
 Kimberly Reed
 Hooman Sabeti-Rahmati, Co-chair
 Ayşe Soysal
 Marzuki Usman
 Dato Wan Ariff Wan Hamzah
 Hasnain Zaidi

References

Islamic Studies Center
Islamic studies